Proterocosma dualis is a moth of the family Agonoxenidae. It was described by Alexey Diakonoff in 1954. It is found in New Guinea.

References

Moths described in 1954
Agonoxeninae
Moths of Asia